Howard Goodsell Cann (October 11, 1895 – December 18, 1992) was an American sportsman best known as the long-time men's basketball coach at New York University. He was also an Olympic shot putter and a college basketball and football player.

Playing career 
Cann was born in Bridgeport, Connecticut, into a family of accomplished sportsmen. His father, Frank Cann, was the director of physical education at New York University, which both Howard and his younger brother Tedford Cann attended. Tedford was an Olympic swimmer and world-record holder in the 200 meter freestyle.

Howard first attended Barringer High School in Newark, New Jersey, and then the High School of Commerce in New York City. At Commerce he was captain of the basketball team, member of the track team and member of the Omega Gamma Delta fraternity.

He briefly attended Dartmouth College and then transferred to New York University. During his freshman year in 1914, Howard was the leading scorer on the NYU Violets men's basketball team. He was captain of the 1916–1917 football team, where he played as a tackle, a punter, and also played in the backfield.

Cann's college career was interrupted by World War I. He left NYU and, along with his brother Tedford, joined the United States Navy. Howard resumed his studies at NYU in 1919, after the end of the war.

In 1920, Cann led the NYU basketball team to an Amateur Athletic Union National Championship title and was named the Helms Athletic Foundation Player of the Year as well as an All-American. A group of newspaper sportswriters also named him as the greatest player in the history of basketball to that date. As a member of the track and field team, he won the shot put competitions at the Penn Relays and the IC4A Middle Atlantic States event. He participated in the 1920 Summer Olympics in Antwerp as a shot putter, finishing the competition in eighth place with a throw of 13.52 meters. He had originally been scheduled to compete as a hurdler, but broke his leg. That same year, Cann graduated from NYU with a degree in engineering.

Coaching career

Basketball
Three years after graduating from NYU, Cann returned to the school as the men's basketball coach. He coached the team for thirty-five years, from 1923 to 1958, and compiled a 429–235 record before his retirement.

His time as the basketball coach included an unbeaten 1933–34 season and a December 29, 1934 game in Madison Square Garden where NYU defeated Notre Dame. This first Madison Square Garden tournament helped to elevate the popularity of college basketball. Cann's 1934–35 team finished the season with an 18–1 record and was retroactively named the national champion by the Helms Athletic Foundation and the Premo-Porretta Power Poll. He led the 1944–45 team to the final game of the National Collegiate Athletic Association tournament, but lost the championship to Oklahoma State University. Cann was named National Coach of the Year in 1947, and led the Violets to the National Invitation Tournament final the next year, but was defeated by Saint Louis University.

Cann retired in 1958, having spent 39 of the first 44 years of his adult life at NYU as a player and coach.

Football
In 1932 and 1933, Cann also coached the NYU football team. His career football coaching record at NYU was 7–7–1.

Accomplishments

In 1968, he was inducted into the Naismith Memorial Basketball Hall of Fame for his accomplishments as a coach. He also served as Director of Physical Education at NYU from 1931 to retirement in 1958 and is commemorated in seven Sports Halls of Fame.

Personal life
Cann married Janet Cann in 1932, and they had a son, Howard, Jr. Cann died at age 97 after a long illness. He was a resident of Irvington, New York, at the time of his death.

Head coaching record

Basketball

Football

See also
 List of NCAA Division I Men's Final Four appearances by coach

References

External links
 

1895 births
1992 deaths
All-American college men's basketball players
American male shot putters
American men's basketball coaches
American men's basketball players
Barringer High School alumni
United States Navy personnel of World War I
Athletes (track and field) at the 1920 Summer Olympics
Basketball coaches from Connecticut
Basketball players from Connecticut
College men's basketball head coaches in the United States
Naismith Memorial Basketball Hall of Fame inductees
National Collegiate Basketball Hall of Fame inductees
NYU Violets football coaches
NYU Violets football players
NYU Violets men's basketball coaches
NYU Violets men's basketball players
Olympic track and field athletes of the United States
People from Irvington, New York
Players of American football from Connecticut
Polytechnic Institute of New York University alumni
Sportspeople from Bridgeport, Connecticut